Ramore Head is a rocky headland in Portrush, County Antrim, Northern Ireland.

Overview
The headland, pointing north-northwest, is the tip of the peninsula on which the town of Portrush lies. The area of the headland is an Area of Special Scientific Interest. The rocks here are dolerite, an intrusive igneous rock formed from volcanic activity. There is a footpath around the headland, with grassland surrounding the path. There are also recreation grounds, including tennis courts and lawn bowls, and a car park.

Out at sea are a string of rocky islands known as the Skerries, the remains of past volcanic activity. These are also part of the Area of Special Scientific Interest.

Gallery

See also
 Coastal landforms of Ireland
 Coastal Zone at Portrush
 List of Areas of Special Scientific Interest in County Antrim
 List of headlands of the United Kingdom

References

External links

 Ramore Head, Portrush, Northern Ireland on YouTube

Headlands of County Antrim
Areas of Special Scientific Interest in County Antrim
Portrush